Pride of Performance is a civil award given by the Government of Pakistan to Pakistani citizens in recognition of distinguished merit in the fields of literature, arts, sports, medicine or science.

2010
In 2009, the following list of recipients was announced. Awards to be actually conferred by the President of Pakistan on Pakistan Day (23 March 2010).

2011
On 14 August 2010, the following list of recipients was announced. Awards to be actually conferred by the President of Pakistan on Pakistan Day (23 March 2011). It consisted of 46 Pakistanis and one Canadian of Pakistani origin.

2012
On 14 August 2011, the following list of recipients was announced for awards to be actually conferred on 23 March 2012. It consists of 43 individuals.

2013
On 13 August 2012, the following list of recipients was announced. Awards to be actually conferred on Pakistan Day (23 March 2013).

2014
On 14 August 2013, the following list of recipients was announced. Awards to be actually conferred on Pakistan Day (23 March 2014)

2015

2016 
 Gulab Chandio
 Wajahat Masood (Journalist)
 Wasif Nagi (Journalist)
 Professor Dr. Ehsan Akbar  (Literature)
  Nisar Qadri (Film and TV actor)   
  Sabz Ali (Music - Tabla Playing)
 Dr. Abdul Ghaffar  (Public Service)
 Najam Ahmed Shah  (Public Service)
 Captain (R) Zahid Saeed  (Public Service)
 Umar Draz Khan  (Public Service)
 Professor Abida Taherani  (Education)
 Ahmad Saeed (Industrialist)
 Munir Ahmed Munir (Journalist)
 Masood Akhtar (TV and Film actor)
 Khalid Saleem Butt (TV and Film actor)
 Waseem Abbas (TV and Film actor)
 Ustad Nathoo Khan (Music - Sarangi Player), posthumously
 Agha Nasir
 Saba Qamar (TV and Film actress)

2017
Awards to be conferred on Pakistan Day (23 March 2017)

On 4 July 2017, Prime Minister Muhammad Nawaz Sharif awarded the Presidential Pride of Performance award to the team management, players and officials of the Pakistan cricket team, for their outstanding performance as the winners of ICC Champions Trophy 2017. Four former senior players were also awarded the Presidential Pride of Performance award :

2018

2019

References

Civil awards and decorations of Pakistan